Konawe Regency is one of the regencies in the province of Southeast Sulawesi, Indonesia. The capital of the regency is Unaaha. The regency was once known as the district of Kendari. The regency had a population of 241,428 at the 2010 Census, but has since been reduced by the separation of the offshore island districts (comprising Wawonii Island) as the new Konawe Islands Regency in 2013. It now covers 5,781.08 km2 and had a population of 257,011 at the 2020 Census. Prior to its division in 2003, 2007 and 2013, Konawe was known as the rice granary of the province of Southeast Sulawesi because half of the province's rice production comes from Konawe.

History 
Konawe Regency was established pursuant to Law No 29 of 1959 (dated 4 July 1959) on the formation of second-level regions in Southeast Sulawesi with the name of Kendari Regency, with the capital being the city of Kendari.

When the Municipality of Kendari was first established under Law No 6 of 1995 (which separated Kendari City from Kendari Regency), the residual Kendari Regency consisted of 19 districts (kecamatan) with 334 villages. Over time, administrative changes led to the changes in the numbers of districts and villages.  In 2002 Kendari Regency consisted of 23 districts with 631 villages. Based on Government Regulation No. 26 of 2004, on 28 September 2004, the residual regency changed its name to Konawe Regency.
 
In 2003, the south part of the regency was formed into a separate South Konawe Regency (Konawe Selatan) covering eleven districts, and subsequently in 2007 seven of the northern districts were likewise split off to form a new North Konawe Regency (Konawe Utara). Finally, in 2013, the seven districts comprising Wawonii Island were split off to form a new Konawe Islands Regency (Konawe Kapulauan).

Administrative districts 
Konawe Regency, since the removal of the seven districts on Wawonii Island to form a new Konawe Islands Regency and the creation of six new districts within the remaining area, is now divided into twenty-nine districts (kecamatan), tabulated below with their areas and their populations at the 2010 Census and the 2020 Census. the table includes the location of the district administrative centre, the number of administrative villages (rural desa and urban kelurahan) in each district, and its post code.

Notes: The districts grouped as "East Konawe" are those surrounding Kendari City. (a) includes 4 offshore islands. (b) included in figures for Sampara District, from which it was cut out. (c) included in figures for Bondoala District, from which it was cut out.
(d) except for Puanaha village, which has a post code of 93411. (e) included in figures for Wonggeduku District, from which it was cut out. (f) includes in figures for Wawotobi District, from which it was cut out. (g) except for the kelurahan of Unaaha, which has a post code of 93418. (h) included in figures for Abuki District, from which it was cut out. (i) included in figures for Tongauna District, from which it was cut out.

Climate
Konawe Regency has a tropical rainforest climate (Af) with moderate rainfall from August to November and heavy rainfall from December to July. The following climate data is for Unaaha, the seat of the regency.

References

Regencies of Southeast Sulawesi